The Rajouri Garden Metro Station is an interchange station between the Blue Line and Pink Line of the Delhi Metro.
The station is used by many to easily access the City Square Mall, locally known as "Lifestyle", located between Rajouri Garden and Tagore Garden.

Connections

Station layout

See also
List of Delhi Metro stations
Transport in Delhi

References

External links

 Delhi Metro Rail Corporation Ltd. (Official site)
 Delhi Metro Annual Reports
 

Delhi Metro stations
Railway stations opened in 2005
Railway stations in West Delhi district